The Mathura–Vadodara section is a railway line connecting Mathura and Vadodara. This section is part of Delhi–Mumbai line.  This section includes Jaipur–Sawai Madhopur, Ajmer–Ratlam and Udaipur–Kota for branching and connectivity to this section.

This section deals primarily with cross traffic consisting of fertilizer, cement, oil, salt, food grains, oil seeds, limestone and gypsum traffic. Container loading is done from here in bulk.

Subsections of Mathura–Vadodara Section

Subsection-1 Jaipur–Sawai Madhopur

Subsection-2 Ajmer–Ratlam

Subsection-3 Udaipur–Kota

Subsection-4 Godhra–Anand

History
Neemuch–Nasirabad railway construction planning was made for joining Rajputana railway and Nasirabad Scindia railway to Neemuch. Although the survey of Neemuch–Nasirabad railway was carried out in the year 1871-72, the construction was started in the year 1879, and the work completed in March 1881.

GIPR's first BG tracks used 65 lb/yd double-headed rails made of wrought iron.  Rails of 80 lb/yd were common (e.g., Indian Midland Railway). Both flat-bottomed and bull-headed rails were commonly used. MG railways started off with 40 lb/yd rails, although 30 lb/yd rails were also used. The Barsi Light Railway used 30 lb/yd rails. The Rajputana Malwa Railway used 50 lb rails.

The first broad gauge line of the division from Godhra to Limkheda was completed in the year 1893 and Limkheda–Dahod, Ratlam line was completed and opened for traffic in the year 1894, while the Ratlam–Nagda–Ujjain BG line completed and opened for traffic during the year 1896.

The whole management of this line was under (BB & CI) Bombay, Baroda & Central India Railway till independence i.e. up to 15.08.1947.

The first rail line in Rajputana, Agra–Bharatpur was built in 1873 under Rajputana–Malwa railway. It was extended up to Ajmer on 1 August 1875 and further extended up to Naseerabad on 14 February 1876. The total length of railways in Rajputana, including the British District of Ajmer–Merwara, was 652 miles in 1881, 943 in 1891, 1,359 in 1901, and 1,576 miles in 1906 A.D., Out of which 739 miles track was the property of the Government of India and the rest was owned by various Native States. Out of 1,576 miles track, 1,528 miles track was on the metre-gauge system and only 48 miles track was on narrow-gauge system.

Some states undertook extension of railways by financing the cost and entrusting the work of construction either to the British Government or to one of the companies already running a railway line. The Sanganer–Sawai Madhopur railway was planned by Jaipur state in this way in 1884-85. The total cost of the line was about Rs. 25 lakhs. The railway line was so planned that it avoided the states of Tonk and Bundi and connected two important trade centres – Sambhar Salt area and the Harauti grain belt. It was hoped that it would make good returns on investment.

The remaining railway line in Rajasthan was the Udaipur–Chitor, a portion of the Bina–Guna–Baran. It connected the towns after which it was named. It was 67 miles in length, and was the property of the Udaipur Durbar, by whom it was constructed between 1895 and 1899, and by whom it was working since 1898. The capital expenditure up to the end of 1904 was nearly 21 lakhs, and the net profits average about 5 per cent.

Electrification
The electrification from Baroda to New Delhi was subsequently taken up during the year 1984.  At present the total route kilometres of electrification is more than 800 km in this section.

Loco sheds and workshops

A wagon workshop at Kota which are engaged in the activity of heavy repairs to passenger coaches and POH of goods wagons especially of oil tank wagons.

Ratlam loco shed holds 100 locos including WDM-2, WDM-3A, WDM-3D, WDG-3A, WDS-6, WDG-4. Vadodara loco shed holds 120 locos including WAG-5HA / WAG5HB, WAG-7.

Speed limits

Mathura–Ratlam and Ratlam–Vadodara section Comes in B-class Section in this class allows speeds up to 130 km/h. Mumbai Rajdhani Express runs at the top speed of 130kmph in this section.

References

5 ft 6 in gauge railways in India
Rail transport in Uttar Pradesh
Rail transport in Rajasthan
Rail transport in Madhya Pradesh
Railway lines in Gujarat
Railway lines opened in 1866
1866 establishments in India
Transport in Vadodara
Transport in Mathura